B is for Bob is a children's music remix album by reggae band Bob Marley & The Wailers, released on 23 June 2009 and is a posthumous album released after Marley's death. The album is a collection of old songs from their previous albums Legend, Rastaman Vibration, and Burnin'.

Track listing
"Three Little Birds" (B Is Version) – 3:21
"Redemption Song" (B Is Mix) – 3:47
"Wake Up and Live, Pt. 1" – 4:26
"Bend Down Low" (B Is Version) – 3:34
"Lively Up Yourself" – 5:11
"Jamming" (B Is Version) – 4:26 
"Small Axe" (B Is Version) – 4:23
"One Love / People Get Ready" – 2:53
"Satisfy My Soul" (B Is Mix) – 4:31
"Could You Be Loved" – 3:57
"Stir It Up" (B Is Version) – 2:54
"High Tide or Low Tide" (B Is Mix) – 4:42

Bob Marley and the Wailers compilation albums
2009 remix albums
2009 compilation albums
Island Records remix albums
Island Records compilation albums
Children's music albums
Tuff Gong albums